Prescott High School is a public high school located in the city of Prescott, Arizona. It is the only high school in the Prescott Unified School District. Historically, Prescott High School drew students from various adjacent school districts, mostly in Prescott Valley (Humboldt Unified School District) and Chino Valley, Arizona (Chino Valley Unified School District); those districts later established their own high schools.

Service area
In addition to almost all of Prescott it serves most of Williamson and sections of Prescott Valley.

 the district takes in high school students from the Hillside Elementary School District, Kirkland Elementary School District, and Skull Valley School District, as it is required to under law. It also takes students from the Yarnell Elementary School District.

Additionally it took high school students from the Walnut Grove Elementary School District, until that district dissolved in 2021.

Academics and programs

PHS offers a solid academic program, including Advanced Placement and Honors courses. Courses offered include Business & Technology, English, Family & Consumer Science, Fine Arts, Foreign Language, Industrial Technology, Air Force Junior ROTC, Mathematics, PEAK, Physical Education, Science, Social Studies, and Special Education. Students also have the opportunity to participate in athletics, theater, orchestra, choir, band, jazz band, Academic Decathlon, and vocational education programs.

Awards and accreditation

The Arizona Department of Education has awarded Prescott High School the distinguished label of "Excelling School" for the last two years. Since 1917, the school has been continuously accredited by North Central Association of Colleges and Schools.

Athletics

Prescott High School is a member of the Arizona Interscholastic Association and is classified in the 4A Conference for schools with an enrollment of 950–1899 students.

SPRING sports include Track and field-Boys / Girls (Var/JV),
Tennis-Boys / Girls (Var/JV), Softball-Girls (Var/JV/Frosh),
and Baseball-Boys (Var/JV/Frosh).

FALL sports include Badminton-Girls (Var/JV), Cross Country-Boys / Girls (Var/JV), Golf (Varsity only), Football (Var/JV/Frosh), Swimming-Boys / Girls (Varsity only), and Volleyball-Girls (Var/JV/Frosh).

WINTER sports include Basketball-Boys (Var/JV/Frosh), Basketball-Girls (Var/JV/Frosh), Soccer-Boys (Var/JV), Soccer-Girls (Var/JV), and
Wrestling (Var/JV/Frosh).

Fine arts
Prescott High School has a Fine arts program. It consists of:

Art:
Art 1–2,
Art 3–4,
Art 5–6,
Art 7–8,
Art AP,
Sculpture,
Adobe photoshop

Drama:
Drama 1–2,
Methods of Theater,
Music Theatre

Drama productions:
Drama Productions 1–2,
Drama Productions 3–4

Choir:
Women's Choir,
Chorale,
Show Choir

Band:
Orchestra,
Symphonic Band,
Percussion/Guard,
Wind Ensemble,
Jazz Ensemble,
Marching Band,

Foreign languages
Prescott High School offers four different languages, whose levels combined total 11 classes.

Offered languages:
French 1–2,
French 3–4,
French 5–6,
German 1–2,
German 3–4,
Japanese 1–2,
Japanese 3–4,
Spanish 1–2,
Spanish 3–4,
Spanish 5–6,
Spanish 1–2 for native speakers

Notable alumni
David Yetman, American academic expert on Sonora, Mexico and an Emmy award-winning media presenter on the world's deserts.  Class of 1959.
John Denny, Major League Baseball pitcher from 1974 to 1986, won the Cy Young award in 1983
Jason Pridie, current MLB player (Minnesota Twins, New York Mets, Philadelphia Phillies, Arizona Diamondbacks)
Kristin Mayes, current Democratic candidate for Arizona Attorney General and a former Republican member of the Arizona Corporation Commission
Nat Russo, fantasy fiction author, Class of 1988 
Brian Stauffer, award-winning illustrator
Ken Bennett, former Secretary of State of Arizona
Robert M. Brutinel, Chief Justice of the Arizona Supreme Court
Fiorello LaGuardia, Mayor of New York City
Skyler Page, creator of the TV show Clarence

References

External links 
Prescott High School

Schools in Yavapai County, Arizona
Public high schools in Arizona
Prescott, Arizona